Tony Kahn is an American broadcaster, published author, scholar and son of the blacklisted screenwriter Gordon Kahn.

Life 
Kahn grew up in Los Angeles, the son of Hollywood screenwriter Gordon Kahn and Barbara Brodie Kahn.  He joined his family in Cuernavaca, Mexico, where his father had fled in the 1950s during the Red Scare, when he was five years old. Ultimately, the family returned to the United States and Kahn graduated magna cum laude from Harvard University, where he was also Phi Beta Kappa.  Kahn also holds a master's degree in Slavic studies from Columbia University.

Work 
Kahn has produced work in various media but is best known for his work in public radio, and is a regular panelist on the public radio quiz show Says You!  He produced and directed the WGBH program Morning Stories and hosted its podcast version., public radio's first. He was the original host of PRI's The World, and a contributor to Minnesota Public Radio's Savvy Traveler. From 1982 to 1985, Kahn hosted a regular social commentary segment on WCVB-TV's nightly newsmagazine Chronicle.

Kahn produced, wrote, and narrated Blacklisted, a six-part public radio series about his childhood as the son of a blacklisted screenwriter, starring Ron Leibman and Carroll O'Connor and featuring Stockard Channing, Eli Wallach, Julie Harris, Jerry Stiller, Spalding Gray, Scott Simon, Susan Stamberg, and Daniel Schorr. He has won numerous broadcasting awards including twelve New England Emmys, six Gold Medals of the New York International Festival, the Ace Award, three Gabriel Awards, the Edward R. Murrow Award for Feature Reporting.

Translation 
The Day is Born of Darkness by Mikhail Dyomin, 1976
Stolen Apples, by Yevgeny Yevtushenko.
From Desire to Desire, by Yevgeny Yevtushenko.
Legends from Invalid Street, by Efraim Sevela.

Audio 
Blacklisted, six-part public radio series, 1995

Video 
Mother's Little Network, producer, writer, and performer, 1974
Media Probes. Soundaround, as writer and host, 1982
The Day the Cold War Came Home, as producer, writer and narrator, 1987
Here in My Arms, producer, writer and narrator, 1990
Learning to Drive, producer, writer and narrator, 1991
Fathers: A Family Album, 1992
Nova, 14 programs, narrator
Frontline, 2 programs, narrator
Chronicle, host of closing social commentary segment (1982–1985)

References

External links 
Official website of The World
Official website of WGBH Boston
Official website of Morning Stories
Official website of Tony Kahn
Interview with Tony Kahn, on Beyond the Margins
The New York Public Library catalog
The Library of Congress

Radio personalities from Los Angeles
American radio producers
Harvard University alumni
NPR personalities
Public Radio International personalities
Living people
Writers from Los Angeles
Columbia Graduate School of Arts and Sciences alumni
People from Cuernavaca
Year of birth missing (living people)